The Tennessee Volunteers men's Swimming and Diving program represents the University of Tennessee located in Knoxville, Tennessee. The Volunteers are currently coached by Matt Kredich. The Vols host their swim meets in the 
Allan Jones Intercollegiate Aquatic Center which was newly built in 2008. The Vols compete in the SEC where they have won 10 SEC team titles, 173 individual titles and 45 relay crowns. Over the past 75 years of competition the Vols have produced numerous All-Americans, 24 Olympians, scored in 53 consecutive NCAA Championship meets, won 45 individual NCAA titles and won 1 NCAA National Title.

The Vols are currently led by 11th year head coach Matt Kredich who was hired on April 12, 2012. He had previously served as the Lady Volunteer Swimming and Diving head coach beginning in 2005. He replaced long-time head coach and former UT swimmer John Trembley who was fired as head coach for embezzlement and inappropriate behavior on university grounds on January 3, 2012.

Decade of dominance
When Ray Bussard was hired in 1968 as head coach for the Vols swimming & diving team the team hadn't competed at the NCAA level since 1959 and had not ever won a team SEC championship. In only his second year as head coach Bussard won the school's first SEC title for men's swimming & diving and would go on to compete in the NCAA tournament. Throughout the 1970s Tennessee owned the 400-freestyle relay at the SEC Championships winning it for ten straight years. During that ten-year span Tennessee earned five straight 800-freestyle relay titles and won the 400 medley crown nine out of 11 times. In 1978 Bussard would accomplish the biggest goal for any team by winning the 1978 NCAA championship. At the start of the championship meet the Vols jumped out to a 24-point lead on the first day of competition and would continue on winning the title. The title was not only a first for a team from the Southeastern Conference but also a first for any team in the south. When Bussard retired in 1988 he finished with a 252-20 overall record and a .926 winning percentage making him the winningest swimming and diving coach in Tennessee history. He left the school having earned NCAA Coach of the Year in 1972 and 1978, as well as SEC Coach of the Year in 1972, 1973, 1975, 1977, and 1978. In 2008 Bussard was inducted in the American Swimming Coaches Association's Hall of Fame.

Head coaches
Source

Yearly record
Sources

Note: The 2020 season was canceled after the SEC Championships due to the Coronavirus Pandemic, the NCAA Championships were not held.

NCAA Individual & Relay champions
The Vols have won 45 NCAA Individual, Relay, and Diving NCAA titles all time.

Conference Individual Event Champions

The Vols have won 218 total SEC individual, relay, and diving titles throughout their history.

Tennessee Volunteers Olympians
The University of Tennessee has had 24 Olympians represent Tennessee's swimming and diving program since the 1970s. Since that time they have earned 11 medals including two individual gold medalists and five gold medals earned as part of a relay. The following list include all of the former and current Olympic participants.

As of the 2020 Tokyo Olympics

Medalists

Participants

See also 

Tennessee Volunteers women's swimming and diving
Swimming at the Summer Olympics

References

External links